Edvarda Klaudine Lie (April 3, 1910 – June 8, 1983) was a Norwegian painter, drawer, and illustrator.

Edvarda Lie was born in Meldal and grew up in Vestvågøy. She created illustrations for many newspapers and magazines, including A-magasinet, and she illustrated book covers—for example, a 1946 edition of Ali Baba og de førti røvere (Ali Baba and the Forty Thieves). In 1944 she published Anatomi for tegnere (Anatomy for Drawers), which was reissued in 1976. From 1936 to 1947, Lie taught fashion illustration at the Norwegian National Academy of Craft and Art Industry. From 1960 to 1964, she painted murals for the Narvik town hall. Her illustrations were often praised for their assertive drawing, light, bright colors, and period decorative style. Her later floral decorations were based on the skirts of traditional women's dress in Lofoten.

References

External links
 Lie's artwork at the Draftsmen's Syndicate archive

1910 births
1983 deaths
20th-century Norwegian painters
20th-century Norwegian women artists
Norwegian women painters
Norwegian women illustrators
Draughtsmen
Norwegian illustrators
People from Vestvågøy